Engelmannia peristenia, called Engelmann daisy or cutleaf daisy, is a  North American species of flowering plants in the family Asteraceae. It is native to the south-central United States, primarily from  Texas, New Mexico, Oklahoma, and southeastern Colorado, but with more isolated populations in Arizona, Louisiana, Arkansas, Missouri, Nebraska, and South Dakota.

Engelmannia peristenia is a branching perennial herb up to 100 cm (40 inches) tall. Leaves at the base can be up to 30 cm (1 foot) long, with the leaves progressively getting smaller higher on the stem. The plant produces many small flower heads, each generally with 8 ray florets and 40-50 disc florets. Flowers bloom March to July. Its habitats include grasslands, roadsides, and pinion-juniper woodlands.

References

External links

photo of herbarium specimen at Missouri Botanical Garden, collected in Missouri in 1892
photo by Gerrit Davidse, showing habit of Engelmannia peristenia 
photo by Gerrit Davidse, showing closeup of flower head of Engelmannia peristenia

Heliantheae
Flora of the United States
Plants described in 1832